Shri Dwarkadheesh Mandir is one of the oldest and largest Hindu temples of Mathura city in state of Uttar Pradesh, India. The current structure of temple was built up by Seth Gokul Das Parikh, the treasurer of then Gwalior State (Scindia) in 1814, with approval and donation from Shrimant Daulatrao Scindia, Maharajah of Gwalior. In this historic temple, Lord Krishna is worshipped in his Dwarkanath or Dwarkadhish form along with his counterpart goddess Radha in form of Radharani.

Architecture 
The temple has a large premises with the main building enclosed by a magnificently carved Rajasthani style entrance with steep steps leading to temple courtyard. In the central courtyard a platform is built up lined up with three rows of richly carved pillars which support the ceiling which is also beautifully painted. Another small temple of another form of Lord Krishna (Vishnu) Shaligram is also built up within the temple courtyard.

Festivals 
The temple management is under the followers of Vallabhacharya sect (whose followers were the original founders of the premises). The main festival of the temple is called Hindola festival which is celebrated annually in the rainy month of Shravan (Occurring in July/August). It is the 13 days long festival. The temple in this duration is beautifully decorated in theme colours. Lord Dwarkadheesh and goddess Radharani are brought out of their sanctum and are placed in beautifully decorated Jhoola (swing) adorned with golden and silver ornaments for the special darshan.Besides Hindola festival, temple also celebrates Janmashtami, Radhastami, Holi and Diwali with great fervour. The temple has religious significance and therefore lakhs of pilgrims visit the shrine every year from different parts of the country and world.

Reach 
This Temple is about 3.5 km from city main railway station Mathura Junction. From there many modes are available to reach the temple including buses, taxis and auto rickshaws, and it takes about 10 minutes to reach the temple. A cycle rickshaw takes about 15–20 minutes only.

Mathura city can be approached by nearest airport at Agra 60 km away. From there a cab or bus for Mathura depot can be taken and then reach the temple by taking a connecting auto or rickshaw.

See also 

 Bankey Bihari Temple
 Radha Rani Temple
 Krishna Janambhoomi
Nidhivan, Vrindavan
 Radha Raman Temple
Radha Vallabh Temple, Vrindavan
Radha Damodar Temple, Vrindavan
 Radha Madan Mohan Temple, Vrindavan
 Dwarkadhish Temple

References

External links 
 Shri Dwarkadhish Temple - Mathura

Hindu temples in Mathura district
Radha Krishna temples
Krishna temples
19th-century Hindu temples